Patrick McPherson (born April 15, 1969) is an American football coach who is the tight-ends-coach for the Seattle Seahawks of the National Football League (NFL). In 2010, he joined the Seahawks as tight ends coach after 11 years with the Denver Broncos, where he was both the quarterbacks and tight ends coach. He joined the Broncos coaching staff in 1998, as a defensive assistant. In 1999, he became an offensive assistant. During his time as the quarterbacks coach from 2003 until 2006 his guidance lead Jake Plummer to set several single-season franchise records, including passing yards. He joined the Seabawks in 2010. During his time with Seattle, he won his second Super Bowl title when the Seahawks defeated his former team the Denver Broncos in Super Bowl XLVIII.

McPherson was a linebacker and captain of the football team at Santa Clara University, where he received his bachelor's degree in English and an M.B.A. His father, Bill McPherson, was a long-time NFL assistant coach.

References

External links

1969 births
Living people
Sportspeople from Santa Clara, California
Santa Clara Broncos football players
American football linebackers
Denver Broncos coaches
Seattle Seahawks coaches